WSTR is an English pop punk band based in Liverpool, England. Their lineup consists of Sammy Clifford (vocals), Phil Wynne (guitar), Alex Tobijanski (bass guitar) and Sean Carson (drums). They are currently signed to Life or Death Records, after previously being signed to No Sleep Records and Hopeless Records.

History

Formation and SKRWD EP (2015)
Formed in 2015, the band signed with No Sleep Records and released its first single, "Graveyard Shift", in March, of which the music video included cameos from members of Neck Deep. Following this, WSTR played at the Pinky Swear Records Fest in Manchester on 2 May, headlined by Man Overboard, and at Furyfest in Liverpool on 3 May, also playing at the Empire Festival in Sheffield on 17 May. WSTR played at the Jump On Demand Records Festival, also in Liverpool, later that June, the Hevy Fest in Port Lympne, Kent, and the Make A Scene Festival in Middlesbrough, North Yorkshire, in August.

The band's first EP, SKRWD, was released on 4 September. It was produced and recorded by Seb Barlow, the brother of Neck Deep's frontman Ben Barlow (later becoming a member himself), at Celestial Recordings. They then played at the Hype Fest in Birmingham on 28 November. In December, WSTR was nominated for Best British Newcomer by Rock Sound, with Boston Manor winning the category.

Red, Green or Inbetween (2016-2017)
In early 2016, the band was included in Kerrang!s Class of 2016 list. They played at the Less Than Three Festival in Derby and opened for Neck Deep on the European leg of their World Tour, with Creeper. Later in July, they played the 2000Trees Festival at Upcote Farm in Cheltenham, Gloucestershire. They released a single, "Lonely Smiles", from their upcoming album in September.

In support of the first album, the band went on its first headlining tour, "The Inbetween Tour", from October to November 2016, with support from Milestones, also playing at the Slam Dunk Festival. During this time, the band recorded an acoustic version of the album's second single, "Footprints", which was made available on a "name your price" basis on their Bandcamp page. They additionally opened for Roam on a UK/Ireland tour in support of the album, Backbone, and released a third single, "Featherweight".

On 20 January 2017, the band released its first full-length album, Red, Green or Inbetween. They then supported Seaway on a UK tour, with The Gospel Youth, and returned to Slam Dunk later that summer. WSTR also played at the Truck Festival at Hill Farm in Oxfordshire, the Reading and Leeds Festivals, the Deadbolt Festival in Manchester and the 2Q Festival in Lincoln, as well as opening for With Confidence on an Australian tour.

Signing to Hopeless Records and Identity Crisis (2018)
On 4 June 2018, the band announced that it was signing with Hopeless Records, and followed the signing by a playing a set at the Download Festival in the UK. WSTR opened for As It Is on several legs of the okay. tour, first in Europe with Courage My Love and then in the UK with Like Pacific and Grayscale. On 31 August, a second LP was released, Identity Crisis, which was led by the singles "Bad to the Bone", "Crisis" and "Silly Me". To support its release, the band joined Neck Deep on the second North American leg of The Peace and the Panic Tour with Trophy Eyes and Stand Atlantic, and went on a headlining UK tour with Between You & Me and Hey Charlie.

"Filthy", Give Yourself a Hell and SKRWD: Reimagined EPs (2019-2020)
In early 2019, WSTR went on tour again as the supporting act for The Faim's UK tour. A cover EP titled Give Yourself a Hell was released, with cover versions of "Give Yourself a Try" by The 1975 and "Gives You Hell" by The All-American Rejects, and played a third Slam Dunk Festival that summer. In autumn, WSTR embarked on the full run of The Noise & Ones to Watch Presents Stand Atlantic and The Faim Co-Headline U.S. Tour, with fellow openers Hold Close and Point North playing on select dates. While on tour, they released a new song, "Filthy".

On 25 November, WSTR set out on a headlining UK tour, starting in Brighton and ending in Nottingham on 8 December. They then joined Grayscale, Hot Mulligan and LURK on the Nella Vita North American Tour: Part II.

On 14 August 2020, WSTR released new versions of two previous songs, "Ain't Great" and "South Drive", from their first EP SKRWD on an EP titled SKRWD: Reimagined.

Future (2021-present)
In late 2021, WSTR announced they had signed a record deal with Life or Death Records and released the single "Jobbo" shortly after.

The band would return at a sold out all-day festival, Twisted Summer Jam, in July 2022 alongside Trash Boat in Doncaster, United Kingdom. 
This show would be the introduction of new guitarist Phil Wynne and new drummer Sean Carson.

On October 28, 2022, a new single “Bot Lobby” was released from an upcoming album due for release in 2023. This was then followed by a headline UK tour starting with a sold out show at the Night & Day in Manchester. Concluding with a hometown show in Liverpool on November 19, 2022. 

On January 27, 2023, the band released another new single, titled “3 Days Sober”. 

Name
Originally named Waster, the group discovered a band with the same name from Canada. Because both bands were selling under the same name on iTunes, the Canadian band issued a "cease and desist" letter. The group ultimately decided to keep the most similar name as possible, removing the vowels, leaving simply WSTR.

Musical style and influences
WSTR is generally credited as a pop punk band. The group's lead singer, Sammy Clifford, has said that many of his musical influences were from the United States, including Blink-182 and New Found Glory.

DiscographyStudio albumsRed, Green or Inbetween (2017)
Identity Crisis (2018)
Til' the Wheels Fall Off (2023)EPsSKRWD (2015)
Give Yourself a Hell (2019)
SKRWD: Reimagined (2020)Singles"Filthy" (2019)
"All the Rage" (2021)
"Jobbo" (2021)
"Bot Lobby" (2022)
”3 Days Sober” (2023)
”Til' The Wheels Fall Off” (2023)Music videos'
  "Graveyard Shift" (2015)
  "Fair Weather" (2015)
  "Lonely Smiles" (2016)
  "Footprints" (2016)
  "Eastbound & Down" (2017)
  "Bad to the Bone" (2018)
  "Crisis" (2018)

References

External links
 

Musical groups from Liverpool
2015 establishments in England
Musical groups established in 2015
Hassle Records artists
Musical quintets
No Sleep Records artists
English pop punk groups
Hopeless Records artists